Hans Egli was a Swiss sports shooter. He competed in two events at the 1920 Summer Olympics winning a bronze medal in the team military pistol.

References

External links
 

Year of birth missing
Year of death missing
Swiss male sport shooters
Olympic shooters of Switzerland
Shooters at the 1920 Summer Olympics
Place of birth missing
Olympic bronze medalists for Switzerland
Olympic medalists in shooting
Medalists at the 1920 Summer Olympics